Machadoia extincta is a moth in the subfamily Arctiinae. It was described by Reich in 1935. It is found in the Brazilian state of São Paulo.

References

Moths described in 1935